Yuheng may refer to:

Eras of the Cheng Han state (304–347):
Yuheng (玉衡; 311–334), era name used by Li Xiong and Li Ban
Yuheng (玉恆; 335–338), era name used by Li Qi (Li Xiong's son)
Yuheng (玉衡), Chinese name of Epsilon Ursae Majoris